Thomas Spessard Cain (born October 11, 1958) is a former professional tennis player from the United States.

Biography
Born in Richmond, Virginia on October 11, 1958, he is the son of Ronald and Susan Cain.

Cain was a member of the US Junior Davis Cup team in 1976. He played varsity tennis while at Southern Methodist University and was an All-American in the 1980 season.

From 1980 he competed professionally and in his first year on tour was a semi-finalist at the Columbus Open, a tournament on the Grand Prix circuit. He had wins over both Johan Kriek and Guy Forget when he made the quarter-finals at Hong Kong in 1982. Another upset win came against then world number 23 Mark Edmondson at the 1983 Stella Artois Championships in Queen's, London. He won a Grand Prix doubles title at the 1983 South Orange Open, with Fritz Buehning.

In Grand Slam competition he appeared in the main draw of all four major tournaments. He took Guillermo Vilas to five sets when he faced the Argentine in the second round of the 1983 US Open. With the score at 1–1 in the fifth set, Cain was injured when he twisted his ankle and slid head first into the scoreboard. Although he was able to continue the match he won only one more game. In both of his appearances at Wimbledon he had to retire hurt during his first round matches, against Tim Gullikson in 1983 and Miloslav Mečíř in 1984.

Retiring from tennis in 1986, Cain then worked with Wheat First Securities for many years. He is now Senior Vice-President with UBS Financial Services and is married with two daughters and a son.

Grand Prix career finals

Doubles: 1 (1–0)

Challenger titles

Singles: (1)

References

External links
 
 

1958 births
Living people
American male tennis players
SMU Mustangs men's tennis players
Tennis people from Virginia
Sportspeople from Richmond, Virginia